The Viking, also known as White Thunder and Vikings of the Ice Field, is a 1931 Newfoundland/American adventure film about sealing directed by George Melford. The Viking was the first film to record sound and dialogue on location with the use of magnetic wire recording.  It is best known for the explosion aboard the ship SS Viking (an actual sealing ship) during filming, in which many members of the crew, including producer Varick Frissell, were killed. It remains the incident with the largest loss of life in film history.

Plot
Set on the coast of Newfoundland, a rivalry develops between Jed Nelson, a seal hunter, and Luke Oarum, a local man considered a jinx. Worried that his rival may try to steal his girlfriend Mary Joe, calling him a coward, the seal hunter goads Luke into accompanying him on an Arctic sealing expedition on Viking, commanded by Capt. Barker. They both end up in a hunting party on the ice floes and eventually find themselves stranded. Jed tries to kill Luke, but the snow blinds him and his gunshot misses.

On recovering his sight at home, Jed gains new respect for his rival and vows that he will beat senseless any man who derides the character of his new friend.

Cast
As listed in the credits:  
 Louise Huntington as Mary Joe
 Charles Starrett as Luke Oarum
 Capt. Robert Abram Bartlett as Capt. Barker
 Arthur Vinton as Jed Nelson

Production
American-born producer Varick Frissell's previous short films, The Lure of Labrador and The Swilin' Racket (also known as The Great Arctic Seal Hunt), prompted him to make a full-length feature entitled Vikings of the Ice Field. Paramount Pictures put up $100,000 to finance the production, while insisting that Hollywood personnel be used.  Frissell hired director George Melford, who had attended McGill University in Montreal and had experience in filming Canadian subjects previously.

By 1930, Frissell had completed most of the principal photography on location in Quidi Vidi. For realistic footage, Frissell then took his crew to the Grand Banks and Labrador to film action sequences. The film was privately shown at the Nickel Theatre at St. John's on March 5, 1931. After this screening, Frissell decided that his film needed more real scenes from the Labrador ice floes. Within days, Frissell and his crew had joined the SS Viking for its annual seal hunt. The ship got trapped in ice near the Horse Islands.

On March 15, 1931, while trying to film an iceberg, Frissell, Alexander Penrod, 25 crew members and a stowaway were killed in an explosion. Some of the survivors made the over-ice trek to the Horse Islands, while others were rescued by vessels dispatched to the area.

Despite the fatal accident, the film was completed and released in June 1931. The title was changed from White Thunder to The Viking. A French-language version Ceux du Viking was released in 1932.

Reception
Reviews for The Viking varied, while the story was generally panned. The New York Times review referred to the film's story as "sketchy". The reviewer, however, noted: "'The Viking', like Mr Varick's silent work, 'The Swilin' Racket', has many marvelous scenes of the ice fields and of the adventures of men on a seal hunt off Labrador. It is enhanced by being made with sound effects, but the dialogue, like the story, is merely incidental."

The Theater Guild Magazine found the story "melodramatic" and the screenplay uninteresting in comparison to the cinematography. The Film Daily gave a negative review, noting the "weakness" of the story.

White Thunder, a National Film Board documentary on Varick Frissell's life, directed by Newfoundlander Victoria King, was released in 2002.

References

Notes

Bibliography

 Rhodes, Gary Don. White Zombie: Anatomy of a Horror Film. Jefferson, North Carolina: McFarland & Company, 2001. . 
 Rist, Peter. Guide to the Cinema(s) of Canada. Westport, Connecticut: Greenwood Publishing Group, 2001. .

External links

 (1932 French-language version)

1931 films
1930s adventure drama films
1930s independent films
American adventure drama films
American independent films
American black-and-white films
Canadian adventure drama films
Canadian independent films
1930s English-language films
Films set in Newfoundland and Labrador
Films set in the Arctic
Films shot in Newfoundland and Labrador
American multilingual films
Films directed by George Melford
Canadian multilingual films
1931 multilingual films
1931 drama films
1930s American films
1930s Canadian films